The Strategic Priorities Budget Committee (SPBC), better known as the Gang of Four, was a political strategic grouping within the Australian Labor Party, comprising then-Prime Minister Kevin Rudd, his deputy Julia Gillard, Treasurer Wayne Swan and Finance Minister Lindsay Tanner. This name refers to the tightly held concentration of political power between the group throughout the First Rudd Government (2007–10), which deliberated on various political issues concerning the Global Financial Crisis to the Carbon Pollution Reduction Scheme.

References

External links 
 The Gang of Four – an excerpt from the ABC's The Killing Season

Australian Labor Party politicians